Camp Olivas is the regional headquarters of the Police Regional Office 3: and is located in  Brgy San Nicolas along Mac Arthur Highway, Camp Olivas, City of San Fernando, Pampanga. It was named after Captain Julian Olivas.

References

Philippine National Police headquarters
Buildings and structures in San Fernando, Pampanga
Detention centers during the Marcos dictatorship